This is a summary of the electoral history of Rishi Sunak, the Leader of the Conservative Party and Prime Minister of the United Kingdom since October 2022. Sunak previously served as Chancellor of the Exchequer from 2020 to 2022, and has been the MP for Richmond (Yorks) since 2015.

Parliamentary elections

2015 general election, Richmond (Yorks)

2017 general election, Richmond (Yorks)

2019 general election, Richmond (Yorks)

July–September 2022 Conservative Party leadership election

October 2022 Conservative Party leadership election
Nominated and elected unopposed by 197 Conservative MPs

Notes

References

Rishi Sunak
Sunak, Rishi
Sunak, Rishi
2022 Conservative Party (UK) leadership elections